Daphnella antillana is a species of sea snail, a marine gastropod mollusk in the family Raphitomidae.

Description
The length of the shell attains 18 mm.

Distribution
D. antillana can be found in Caribbean waters, off the coast of Cuba. and Brazil.

References

 Espinosa J. & Fernández-Garcés R. (1990). El género Daphnella (Mollusca: Neogastropoda) en Cuba. Descripción de nuevas especies. Poeyana. 396: 1-16

External links
  Rosenberg, G.; Moretzsohn, F.; García, E. F. (2009). Gastropoda (Mollusca) of the Gulf of Mexico, Pp. 579–699 in: Felder, D.L. and D.K. Camp (eds.), Gulf of Mexico–Origins, Waters, and Biota. Texas A&M Press, College Station, Texas
 Biolib.cz : image
 
 Gastropods.com: Paradaphne antillana

antillana
Gastropods described in 1990